The former Weeks Junior High School, also known as John Wingate Weeks Junior High School, is a historic school located at 7 Hereward Road, corner of Rowena Road in the village of Newton Center in Newton, Massachusetts. built in 1930, it was named for John Wingate Weeks (April 11, 1860 – July 12, 1926), who was mayor of Newton 1903–1904 before becoming a United States representative from Massachusetts from 1905 to 1913, a United States Senator from 1913 to 1919, and the United States Secretary of War from 1921 to 1925. He also was a co-founder in 1888 of the investment firm Hornblower & Weeks. His son Sinclair Weeks was mayor of Newton when the school was opened.

Weeks Junior High School was added to the National Register of Historic Places in 1984.

Today the former Weeks Junior High School building is John W. Weeks House, a HUD apartment complex owned by the city and managed by the Newton Community Development Foundation, Inc.

Gallery

See also
 National Register of Historic Places listings in Newton, Massachusetts

References

External links

 HABS architectural drawings, notes and photographs are available by going to HABS search page and entering Weeks Junior High School in the search.

National Register of Historic Places in Newton, Massachusetts
School buildings on the National Register of Historic Places in Massachusetts
School buildings completed in 1930
Schools in Newton, Massachusetts
1930 establishments in Massachusetts